The Outer Circle was a London & North Western Railway service in London that operated from 1872 to 1908. Although not a complete circuit, it was one of several 'circle' routes around London that opened at the same time, such as the 'inner circle' that is today's Circle line. Trains would run once every 30 minutes. In 1908 the service was cut back to run from Earl's Court to Broad Street.

Outer Circle

History
This service became known as the 'outer circle' and was worked with L&NWR locomotives and carriages and there was a train every thirty minutes. When the District electrified in 1905, it built electric locomotives to haul the carriages between Earl's Court and Mansion House. The service appears on the 1908 'London Underground' map between Earl's Court and Uxbridge Road as a District Railway service.

The service ceased to run east of Earl's Court from 1 January 1909. The L&NWR electrified the West London Railway and an electric service between Willesden Junction and Earl's Court on started 1 May 1914. This was initially with electric multiple units provided by the District Railway until 24 November 1914 when LNWR electric units took over. Passenger services on the West London Railway ended on 19 October 1940 following bomb damage to the line

Uxbridge Road station closed with the line in 1940 and  opened on the same site in 2008. The line is currently served by the District line between Mansion House and Kensington (Olympia) and then the London Overground to Haggerston.

List of stations

The following stations, listed anti-clockwise, were served by the Outer Circle:

Super Outer Circle

The Midland Railway operated a kind of Super Outer Circle from 1878 to 1880. In 1876 the Midland had negotiated running rights over the  Metropolitan District Railway from the London & South Western Railway at Hammersmith to South Kensington. The Midland's main interest was supplying coal to Kensington, and in 1878 it opened coal depots at Kensington High Street and West Kensington. Two trains an hour ran until 30 September 1880. The coal depots closed in the 1960s.

See also
Middle Circle
Circle line (London Underground)

References

Notes

Sources

External links
 Clive's Underground Line Guides - Circle Line

Transport in the London Borough of Brent
Transport in the London Borough of Camden
Transport in the City of London
Transport in the London Borough of Hackney
Transport in the London Borough of Hammersmith and Fulham
Transport in the London Borough of Islington
Transport in the Royal Borough of Kensington and Chelsea
Transport in the City of Westminster
London and North Western Railway